Songs Forever is the ninth studio album by German singer Thomas Anders. It was released by Edel Records on 3 March 2006. Consisting mainly of popular covers, it debuted and peaked at number 43 on the German Albums Chart.

Track listing
All tracks co-produced by Thomas Anders, Achim Brochhausen, and Peter Ries; except track 14, produced by Lukas Hilbert.

Personnel and credits 
Adapted from album booklet.
 Thomas Anders – executive producer, mixing, producer
 Achim Brochhausen – mixing, producer
 Manfred Faust-Senn – recording 
 Lukas Hilbert – producer (reissue)
 Peter Ries – mixing, producer

Charts

References

2006 albums
Thomas Anders albums